The following is a List of broadcasters for the Detroit Lions, both past and present.

Radio

Current

The Lions' flagship radio station is WXYT-FM 97.1. The broadcast team includes Dan Miller on play-by-play, Lomas Brown on color commentary, and T. J. Lang as sideline reporter. 

The team moved back to WXYT after having been on WJR since the 2016 NFL season, which followed a 20-year relationship with WXYT. The decision to part with WXYT was reportedly instigated by a demand by the team for the station to fire on-air personality Mike Valenti—who has had a history of making comments critical of the Lions during his drive-time show—as a condition of any future renewal. A CBS Radio spokesperson stated that their refusal was meant to maintain the station's integrity.

Former

WXYT (AM) was the sole flagship station from 1998 - 2004. WKRK-FM (later WXYT (AM)) became the co-flagship in 2004.

Detroit's WWJ was the team's flagship station prior to 1998 and continued to simulcast WXYT (AM)'s broadcasts prior to the team's move to WKRK.  Prior to 1989, WJR had served as the Lions' radio flagship.

TV

Current

Preseason

As of 2015, WJBK is the flagship station. The announcers are Matt Shepard with play-by-play, Chris Spielman with color commentary, and Tori Petry with sideline reports. The late Fred McLeod was once a play-by-play TV broadcaster on Lions pre-season.

Regular season
Regular season games are broadcast regionally on FOX, except when the Lions play an AFC team in Detroit, in which case the game airs regionally on CBS. The annual Thanksgiving Day game in Detroit is televised nationally on either Fox or CBS, depending on who the visiting team is.

The Lions' official regular season show of record is Lions GameDay Live with Dan Miller hosting.

For regular season games vs. NFC opponents when Fox doesn't have a double header, WJBK produces a live postgame show.

Former

WKBD was the preseason flagship station from 1992–1996 and from 2004-2007. WDIV and WJBK have served as flagships at various times. 

WWJ-TV was the flagship station from 2008-2010.

WJBK (channel 2) has been the Fox affiliate in Detroit since December 1994, before that it was a CBS affiliate, and as such, WJBK for many years has served as the primary station for most Lions games. For much of 1994, while WJBK was waiting for its CBS affiliation contract to expire, the Lions games were shown on WKBD-TV (at the time owned by Viacom, now owned by CBS as a sister to WWJ-TV), with the last game being the December 10 game against the New York Jets, on WKBD's last day as a Fox affiliate.

Interconference home games were first televised in 1973 (when the NFL first imposed the 72-hour deadline), and for 25 years these were seen on NBC, with WDIV (channel 4, originally WWJ-TV) airing the games locally. The current WWJ-TV (originally on analog channel 62) has aired such games since 1998 when the AFC contract moved to CBS.

Fox Sports Detroit formerly produced a live postgame and Monday press conference show called Lions Live. It was canceled after the 2007 season.

Blackouts
The Lions' winless performance in 2008 and 2–14 season in 2009 led to several local broadcast blackouts, as local fans did not purchase enough tickets by the 72 hour blackout deadline. In 2008, five of the Lions' final six home games of the season did not sell out, with the Thanksgiving game being the exception. The first blackout in the 7-year history of Ford Field was the October 26, 2008 game vs. the Washington Redskins. The previous 50 regular season home games had been sellouts.

Games were also often blacked out at the Lions' previous home the (perhaps oversized) 80,000 seat Pontiac Silverdome, despite winning seasons and the success and popularity of star players such as Barry Sanders.

Announcers by year

Television

Radio

Other:

Van Patrick called play-by-play from 1950 until his death in 1974.

References

Detroit Lions
 
broadcasters